was a railway station located in Suzu, Ishikawa Prefecture, Japan. This station was abandoned on April 1, 2005.

From over 70 proposals received, artwork by Hong Kong artist Dylan Kwok has been selected to be displayed at Ukai Station in Suzu, Ishikawa Prefecture as part of the Station by the Sea at Oku-Noto Triennale - Residence and Exhibition Programme, held from September 4 until October 24, 2021.

Line
 Noto Railway
 Noto Line

Adjacent stations

References

External links 
 Ukai Station (Ishikawa) page at notor.info

Railway stations in Ishikawa Prefecture
Defunct railway stations in Japan
Railway stations closed in 2005
Railway stations in Japan opened in 1964